Zou Yuan is a fictional character in Water Margin, one of the Four Great Classical Novels in Chinese literature. Nicknamed "Forest Emerging Dragon", he ranks 90th among the 108 Stars of Destiny and 54th among the 72 Earthly Fiends.

Background
Zou Yuan, a native of Laizhou, is skilled in martial arts. Upright and principled, he is intolerant of people he is contemptuous of. Before becoming an outlaw, he used to be a vagrant who indulged in gambling.

Zou Yuan and his nephew Zou Run, who is about his age, lead a group of outlaws at Mount Dengyun near Laizhou. They practise the principle of robbing the rich to help the poor. The Zous are close friends of Sun Xin and Yang Lin, Deng Fei and Shi Yong of Liangshan Marsh.

Joining Liangshan
The Xie brothers (Xie Zhen and Xie Bao) are arrested in Dengzhou (登州; in present-day eastern Shandong) for smashing up the house of one Squire Mao who has pocketed the tiger they shot to claim reward at the prefectural office. Yue He, a jailer in the prison and a distant relative of the Xies, takes the news to their cousin Gu Dasao, warning that the brothers could be murdered in prison. Gu's husband Sun Xin enlists the Zous to help in the rescue. Sun Xin also compels his brother Sun Li, the garrison commandant of Dengzhou, to join the plan. After they extricated the Xies from prison, the group flee to join the Liangshan Marsh.

Before going up to the stronghold, Sun Li volunteers to infiltrate the Zhu Family Manor, which Liangshan has failed to take in two offensives. As Sun Li has learnt combat from the same teacher as Luan Tingyu, the martial arts instructor of the manor, he wins the confidence of the Zhus. Zou Yuan, together with Zou Run, Sun Xin, Gu Dasao, the Xie brothers and Yue He, goes on a rampage inside the manor, taking it by surprise, when Sun Li gives his signal. The fall of the Zhu Family Manor is a great contribution by the group before their acceptance into Liangshan.

Campaigns and death 
Zou Yuan is appointed as one of the leaders of the Liangshan infantry after the 108 Stars of Destiny came together in what is called the Grand Assembly. He participates in the campaigns against the Liao invaders and rebel forces in Song territory following amnesty from Emperor Huizong for Liangshan.

In the battle of Qingxi County (清溪縣; present-day Chun'an County, Zhejiang) in the campaign against Fang La's rebel forces, Zou Yuan is trampled to death by the enemy's cavalry.

References 

 
 
 
 
 
 
 

72 Earthly Fiends
Fictional characters from Shandong